This is a complete list of music directors of the Ojai Music Festival, an American festival of classical music held annually in Ojai, California. The list is shown both alphabetically and chronologically.

Alphabetical listing

A–E 
John Adams: 1993, 2021
Pierre-Laurent Aimard: 2007
Leif Ove Andsnes: 2012
Emanuel Ax: 1997
George Benjamin: 2010
Pierre Boulez: 1967, 1970, 1984, 1989, 1992, 1996, 2003
Aaron Copland: 1957–1958, 1976
Robert Craft: 1954–1956, 1959, 1982
Ingolf Dahl: 1957, 1964–1966
Peter Maxwell Davies: 1988, 1991
eighth blackbird: 2009
Emerson String Quartet: 2002

F–J 
Lukas Foss: 1961–1963, 1979–1980, 1987
Lawrence Foster: 1968
John Harbison: 1991
Daniel Harding: 1997
Thor Johnson: 1947–1950, 1952–1953

K–O 
Oliver Knussen: 2005
Patricia Kopatchinskaja 2018
Robert LaMarchina: 1968
Daniel Lewis: 1981, 1983
Nicholas McGegan: 1988
Stefan Minde: 1969
Stephen Mosko: 1986, 1990
Kent Nagano: 1985, 1986, 1995, 2004

P-S 
Simon Rattle: 2000
Edward Rebner: 1949
David Robertson: 2008
Esa-Pekka Salonen: 1999, 2001
Gerhard Samuel: 1971
Calvin Simmons: 1978
Robert Spano: 2006
William Steinberg: 1951
Igor Stravinsky: 1955–1956

T–Z 
Henri Temianka: 1960
Michael Tilson Thomas: 1968, 1969, 1973–1975, 1977, 1994
Mitsuko Uchida: 1998
Dawn Upshaw: 2011
Diane Wittry: 1988
Michael Zearott: 1969, 1972
David Zinman: 1998

Chronological listing

1940s 
1947 Thor Johnson
1948 Thor Johnson and Edward Rebner
1949 Thor Johnson

1950s 
1950 Thor Johnson
1951 William Steinberg
1952 Thor Johnson
1953 Thor Johnson
1954 Robert Craft
1955 Robert Craft and Igor Stravinsky
1956 Robert Craft and Igor Stravinsky
1957 Aaron Copland and Ingolf Dahl
1958 Aaron Copland
1959 Robert Craft

1960s 
1960 Henri Temianka
1961 Lukas Foss
1962 Lukas Foss
1963 Lukas Foss
1964 Ingolf Dahl
1965 Ingolf Dahl
1966 Ingolf Dahl
1967 Pierre Boulez
1968 Robert LaMarchina, Lawrence Foster and Michael Tilson Thomas
1969 Michael Zearott, Stefan Minde and Michael Tilson Thomas

1970s 
1970 Pierre Boulez
1971 Gerhard Samuel
1972 Michael Zearott
1973 Michael Tilson Thomas
1974 Michael Tilson Thomas
1975 Michael Tilson Thomas
1976 Aaron Copland
1977 Michael Tilson Thomas
1978 Calvin Simmons
1979 Lukas Foss

1980s 
1980 Lukas Foss
1981 Daniel Lewis
1982 Robert Craft
1983 Daniel Lewis
1984 Pierre Boulez
1985 Kent Nagano
1986 Kent Nagano and Stephen Mosko
1987 Lukas Foss
1988 Nicholas McGegan, Peter Maxwell Davies and Diane Wittry
1989 Pierre Boulez

1990s 
1990 Stephen Mosko
1991 John Harbison and Peter Maxwell Davies
1992 Pierre Boulez
1993 John Adams
1994 Michael Tilson Thomas
1995 Kent Nagano
1996 Pierre Boulez
1997 Emanuel Ax and Daniel Harding
1998 Mitsuko Uchida and David Zinman
1999 Esa-Pekka Salonen

2000s 
2000 Simon Rattle
2001 Esa-Pekka Salonen
2002 Emerson String Quartet
2003 Pierre Boulez
2004 Kent Nagano
2005 Oliver Knussen
2006 Robert Spano
2007 Pierre-Laurent Aimard
2008 David Robertson
2009 eighth blackbird

2010s 
2010 George Benjamin
2011 Dawn Upshaw
2012 Leif Ove Andsnes
2013 Mark Morris
2014 Jeremy Denk
2015 Steven Schick
2016 Peter Sellars
2017 Vijay Iyer
2018 Patricia Kopatchinskaja

See also

 Lists of musicians

External links
 Official Ojai Music Festival website

Ojai, California
Music of California
Classical music lists
Lists of American musicians
Lists of people from California
Organizations based in Ventura County, California